Granger Boston (24 May 1921 – 4 February 1958) was an English cricketer. He played three first-class matches for Cambridge University Cricket Club in 1946.

See also
 List of Cambridge University Cricket Club players

References

External links
 

1921 births
1958 deaths
English cricketers
Cambridge University cricketers
Cricketers from Liverpool